Hawksbill Mountain is a mountain with an elevation of . Marking the border between Madison County and Page County in Virginia, the summit of Hawksbill Mountain is the highest point in Shenandoah National Park, as well as the highest point in both Madison and Page counties.

The north face of Hawksbill Peak is a  drop into Timber Hollow, which is the largest elevation change in the park. The summit is one of the few places in Shenandoah National Park where one can find balsam fir, a tree more typical of northern New England and southeast Canada.

The National Park Service has constructed a stone observation platform at the summit. Byrd's Nest No. 2, one of a series of shelters built in the park by Senator Harry Byrd, is nearby. Hawksbill peak is also the site of a peregrine falcon restoration project. The summit of Hawksbill Mountain can be reached by a short hike from a trailhead located at the Upper Hawksbill parking area, just off of Skyline Drive in Shenandoah National Park.

Gallery

See also
List of mountains in Virginia
Mountain peaks of Virginia

References

External links
 
 Shenandoah National Park
 TopoQuest Quad map

Mountains of Shenandoah National Park
Mountains of Madison County, Virginia
Mountains of Page County, Virginia
Highest points of United States national parks
Mountains on the Appalachian Trail
Blue Ridge Mountains